Ian Gus Hodgetts is an Australian born, international lawn bowler from Jersey.

Bowls career
In 2015, he won the fours gold medal at the Atlantic Bowls Championships.

References

Jersey bowls players
Living people
Year of birth missing (living people)